BEST PIECES is the first best-album from Yoko Takahashi, including the hit single Zankoku na Tenshi no Thesis and many others. The album reached #65 in the Oricon weekly charts and charted for four weeks.

Track listing

References

1996 albums
Yoko Takahashi albums